Miona Springs is a spring in the U.S. state of Georgia.

"Miona" is a name of a fictional Indian princess character taken from a Civil War-era work. It was once believed that the waters of Miona Springs had healing properties, and in 1915 a mineral spa resort stood there.

References

Rivers of Georgia (U.S. state)
Rivers of Macon County, Georgia